Roma Porta San Paolo is the terminal train station of the Rome–Lido railway line in Rome (Italy). 
The station is connected to the station Piramide of the metro (line B) and to the Roma Ostiense railway station of the Ferrovie dello Stato Italiane. It has six tracks.

The edifice houses the ticket office and service structures, as well as a news-stand and a coffee shop. It also includes the Porta San Paolo Railway Museum.

History 

The building of the station was started, together with the one of the railway, at the beginning of 1919, after the inauguration ceremony of December 30, 1918 in the presence of King Victor Emmanuel III.

The station was designed by Marcello Piacentini. A quite similar one was the Ostia Nuova terminal train station, whose foundation stone was laid on December 10, 1920, also in the presence of the King, and that was destroyed during the war.

The graffiti decorating the interior of the station are works by the Florentine artist Giulio Rosso.

The station and the railway line were inaugurated on August 10, 1924 with a special ride, in which Mussolini – who had become Prime Minister in the meanwhile – took part.

Services
The station has available the following services:
 Ticket office
 Accessibility to disabled persons
 Coffee shop
 News stand
 Museum

Interchanges

Metro
  Piramide station, Line B.

Railway
   
Roma Ostiense railway station

Buses
 Terminus station for ATAC bus and tram lines
Weekdays and holidays: 77 – 775
Weekdays only: 769 
Night: n3d – n3s
 ATAC passing bus lines 
Weekdays and holidays: 3 – 23 – 30EX – 75 – 83 – 280 – 715 – 716 – 718 – 719
Night: nMB – nME – n716

Porta San Paolo
Railway stations opened in 1924